Rosa is a female sea otter at the Monterey Bay Aquarium, born August 26, 1999. She was brought to the aquarium when she was four weeks old, found stranded on a beach in Santa Cruz County in September 1999. At that time, she weighed 5 pounds. Rosa was released at age two for two years, but had to return to the aquarium because she continued to interact with humans by jumping on swimmers and kayakers which posed a risk to herself and people. Rosa has acted as a surrogate mother for 15 abandoned otters as part of the aquarium. Her name originates from a short novel, John Steinbeck's Tortilla Flat.

Rosa is currently the oldest known living sea otter at 23 years and 6 months old. She is older than the oldest known male sea otter, Adaa, who lived to be 22 years 8 months old before his death but not older than the oldest known female otter, Etika, who lived to be 28 years old.

Appearance, habits and care 
Rosa is characterized by her large figure with soft silver colored fur and white freckles on her head. She can be seen on the otter cam and normally rests on the water surface at the center window after feeding. She for a period of time loved eating live food with shells and also loves to eat crabs. She raised 15 otters before retiring in 2019 with her last otters being released into the wild in October of that year. She has been slowed down by a heart condition and very limited eyesight. However, she has lived to her old age by being fed daily using plastic balls, called boomer balls, or other toys to deliver food, and she is groomed regularly with a health monitoring team that does personal training sessions that accommodates Rosa's limits. Rosa receives a physical checkup three times a year with radiographs, blood tests, and dental care. The Aquarium Staff have also built a ramp in 2013 to deal with potential arthritis. Her diet is adjusted based on her weight which gets regularly checked. Normally the toys are either bought by staff as presents from a dog store or with the boomer balls bought from an online manufacturer. Some of the trained behaviors exhibited by Rosa are getting on weight scales, sticking up her paws for inspection, allowing the usage of eyedrops on her including being able to target on to a target pole to position her, and opening her mouth for inspection, but like many other otters at the aquarium she has over 20 different behaviors.

Rosa's birthday 
Starting from Rosa's 20th birthday, Twitch streamer and YouTuber Douglas Wreden has hosted annual charity livestreams to raise money for the Monterey Bay Aquarium. These streams have massively contributed to Rosa's popularity. During Doug's most recent stream, celebrating Rosa's 23rd birthday, he and the livestream viewers raised over $100,000 for the Aquarium.

References 

Individual animals in the United States
Otters

